The 2015 Grand Prix cycliste de Gatineau was held on 4 June 2015, in Gatineau, Canada. A  women's road cycling race, it was won by Kirsten Wild, who beat Joëlle Numainville (Canada) and Christine Majerus (Luxembourg).

Results

References

Grand Prix cycliste de Gatineau
Grand Prix cycliste de Gatineau
Cycle races in Canada
June 2015 sports events in Canada